33 Battalion or the Eastern Caprivi Battalion, was a light infantry battalion that was part of the SWATF.

History

Origin
33 Battalion was established in 1977 under the command of Major G. Preton-Thomas with a strength of one company.

The main base was at Mpacha in Sector 70 or the Caprivi Strip.

Operations
The unit was mainly deployed in the Caprivi, but took part in a number of external operations into Zambia and from 1978 deployed companies into Kavango, Kaokaland and Owambo. During these operations the unit lost 8 Caprivians and 2 South African members.

Renaming
The South West Africa Territory Force SWATF renumbered battalion numbers according to their geographical positioning on the border. The prefix 10 pertained to battalions operating to the west of the Kavango River, 20 to the Kavango or central region and 70 to the eastern region. Under this system, 33 Battalion was renamed 701 Battalion in 1980.

Attachments
From 1983, a company of marines was attached.

33 Battalion also had an attached SWATF armoured car squadron and an artillery battery.

Insignia
The units flash was officially introduced during 1982 under the command of Commandant J.A. Victor.

List of casualties
1985, Basson, J.L. Cav
1988, Thomas, J.A. Lt

Notes

References

Military history of Namibia
Military units and formations of South Africa in the Border War
Military units and formations established in 1977